Diocese of Stockholm may refer to:

 Church of Sweden Diocese of Stockholm
 Roman Catholic Diocese of Stockholm